Arthuna is a town in Banswara district, Rajasthan, India.

History 
The old name of the place was Utthunaka. It was the capital of Paramara rulers of Vagad during eleventh-twelfth centuries A.D. They patronized both Jainism and Saivism simultaneously, so they constructed a number of Shiva and Jain temples.

Arthuna temple
An inscription of the Paramara prince Chamundaraja records that he built a temple of Shiva called Mandalesa in honour of his father in A.D. 1079. Another inscription of A.D. 1080 mentions that his officer’s son named Anantapala also founded a temple of Shiva. In a group of temples known as Hanumangarhi is located Nilakantha Mahadeva temple, besides other shrines and a stepped Kunda. There are three Shiva temples. The place was associated with the Lakulisa sect of Saivism. The temples of Hanuman and Vishnu also belong to the early period. Bhushana built a Jaina temple in A.D. 1190. A few Jain pillars also being found at the site which were built probably after 11th century. Another temple at the site is of the Chaunsatha Yoginis. Galiakot and Banswara are the two nearby religious places for the Bohras. The nearest large town is Partapur.

Transport 
Nearest international airport - Ahmedabad 255 km.
Nearest airport - Udaipur 150 km.
Nearest railway station - Ratlam 115 km.

Arthuna is 145 km away from Udaipur. One can get a bus for it from Ratlam from where it is at distance of 115 km.
Area code for telephone is 0091-2963

References 

Cities and towns in Banswara district
Tourist attractions in Banswara district